Orlovsky District is an administrative and municipal district (raion), one of the twenty-four in Oryol Oblast, Russia. It is located in the center of the oblast. Its administrative center is the city of Oryol (which is not administratively a part of the district). Population: 67,384 (2010 Census);

Administrative and municipal status
Within the framework of administrative divisions, Orlovsky District is one of the twenty-four in the oblast. The city of Oryol serves as its administrative center, despite being incorporated separately as a city of oblast significance—an administrative unit with the status equal to that of the districts.

As a municipal division, the district is incorporated as Orlovsky Municipal District. The city of oblast significance of Oryol is incorporated separately from the district as Oryol Urban Okrug.

Notable residents 

Georgy Rodin (1897–1976), Red Army lieutenant general, born in Bolotovo village
Grigory Zhilkin (born 2003), football player, born in Biofabrika

References

Notes

Sources

Districts of Oryol Oblast
